Puppies around the age of two weeks old start to experience teething. Teething is the process by which a puppy's deciduous teeth come in and then fall out to make way for their permanent teeth. By 5-6 weeks of life, all of the deciduous teeth have come in, puppies will grow in a set of 28 deciduous teeth or needle teeth. Permanent teeth will start coming in around 12-16 weeks, and puppies will eventually end up with 42 permanent teeth. The process of teething is painful to puppies much like babies. During this process puppies will experience increased salivation, loss of appetite, and extreme irritability when the teeth do erupt from the gums. The gums will swell and become tender to palpation just prior to the tooth coming in. Puppies may exhibit excessive chewing, nipping, and drooling. Some ways that dog owners can help their puppies during this painful teething stage is to ensure that your puppy has something to chew on that is soothing for them. Often times pet owners will freeze teething toys to soothe their dogs irritated gums. Veterinarians do recommend chew toys help relieve teething pain. As your puppies adult teeth start to grow in it is important to start maintaining the dog's dental health.

See also 
 Tooth eruption
 Deciduous teeth
 Permanent teeth

References 

Teeth
Dogs